Variimorda basalis is a species of tumbling flower beetles in the subfamily Mordellinae of the family Mordellidae.

References

External links
 Biolib
 Fauna Europaea

Mordellidae
Beetles described in 1854
Beetles of Europe
Taxa named by Achille Costa